Wilkens is a surname.  Notable people with the surname include:

 Andrea Wilkens (born 1984), German footballer
 Carl Wilkens (born c. 1957), American involved in genocide rescue efforts
 Elmer Wilkens (1901–1967), American football player
 Henry Wilkens (1855–1895), American Medal of Honor recipient
 Iman Wilkens (1936-2018), author of Where Troy Once Stood
 Jan Wilkens (born 1943), South African wrestler
 Lenny Wilkens (born 1937), American basketball player and coach
 Leo Wilkens (1893–1967), Swedish rowing coxswain
 Piter Wilkens (born 1959), Dutch musician
 Theodoor Wilkens (1690–1748), painter from the Northern Netherlands
 Tom Wilkens (born 1975), American swimmer
 Toni Wilkens (born 1962), Swedish actor

See also
 1688 Wilkens, a main-belt asteroid
 Automotive Tooling Systems v Wilkens, a legal case in South African labour law
 Wilken
 Wilkins
 Wickens
 Wilkes